Gadsby is a hamlet in central Alberta, Canada that is under the jurisdiction of the County of Stettler No. 6. Incorporated in 1909, it dissolved from village status in early 2020.

History 
Gadsby was named for Toronto reporter Henry Franklin Gadsby, the namesake for a post office that was opened in 1909.
It was incorporated as the Village of Gadsby on May 6, 1910. At a population of 40, Gadsby was Alberta's smallest village as of the 2016 census. It dissolved from village status to become a hamlet under the jurisdiction of the County of Stettler No. 6 on February 1, 2020.

Demographics 

As a designated place in the 2016 Census of Population conducted by Statistics Canada, Gadsby had a population of 40 living in 24 of its 25 total private dwellings, a  change from its 2011 population of 25.

Notable people 
Barbara Kent, silent film actress
Chester Reynolds, Alberta politician

See also 
List of communities in Alberta
List of former urban municipalities in Alberta
List of hamlets in Alberta

References 

1910 establishments in Alberta
2020 disestablishments in Alberta
Designated places in Alberta
Former villages in Alberta
Hamlets in Alberta
Populated places disestablished in 2002